Rational may refer to:

 Rational number, a number that can be expressed as a ratio of two integers
 Rational point of an algebraic variety, a point defined over the rational numbers
 Rational function, a function that may be defined as the quotient of two polynomials
 Rational fraction, an expression built from the integers and some variables by addition, subtraction, multiplication and division
 Rational Software, a software company now owned by IBM
 Tenberry Software, formerly Rational Systems, a defunct American software company
 Rational AG, a German manufacturer of food processors
 RationaL, stage name of Canadian hip-hop artist Matt Brotzel
 The Rationals, a former American rock and roll band
 Rational, a personality classification in the Keirsey Temperament Sorter

See also
Rationality
Rationale (disambiguation)
Rationalism (disambiguation)
Rationalization (disambiguation)